This is a list of Peruvian billionaires based on an annual assessment of wealth and assets compiled and published by Forbes magazine in 2020.

2020 Peruvian billionaires list

See also 

 The World's Billionaires
 List of countries by the number of billionaires

References 

Lists of people by wealth
Net worth